Fangio, the Demon of the Tracks is a 1950 Argentine motor racing film directed by Román Viñoly Barreto, starring Yvonne Bastien, Ernesto Bianco, Armando Bo and Néstor Deval.

The film is a biopic about the life of legendary Argentine motor racer Juan Manuel Fangio and also features himself in a few cameo roles.

Cast
  Armando Bo
  Miguel Gómez Bao
  Eva Dongé
  Ivonne De Lys
  Domingo Sapelli
  Ernesto Bianco
  Maruja Roig
  Luis Elías Sojit
  Jacinto Herrera
  Néstor Deval
  Fernando Labat
  Vicente Thomas
  Ricardo Degrossi
  Juan Manuel Fangio as himself.
  Aníbal Romero

References

External links
 

1950 films
1950s Spanish-language films
Argentine black-and-white films
Films directed by Román Viñoly Barreto
Argentine auto racing films
1950s sports films
Biographical films about sportspeople
Cultural depictions of Juan Manuel Fangio
Juan Manuel Fangio
1950s Argentine films